A Very Private Affair is a 1962 French romantic drama film directed by Louis Malle and starring Brigitte Bardot.

Premise 
Eighteen-year-old Jill enjoys a comfortable upper-class existence with her widowed mother in Switzerland and develops a crush on Fabio, a friend's husband. She heads off to Paris to become a model and dancer. Soon, Jill is discovered by a film producer and made into a huge movie star. The pressures and annoyances of fame take their toll on her and she returns to Switzerland to recuperate. Jill has an affair with the now divorced Fabio. The press continues to hound her, leading to more complications in her private life.

Cast 
 Brigitte Bardot as Jill
 Marcello Mastroianni as Fabio Rinaldi
 Nicolas Bataille as Edmond
 Jaqueline Doyen as Juliette
 Eléonore Hirt as Cécile
 Ursula Kubler as Carla
 Gregor von Rezzori as Gricha
 Dirk Sanders as Dick
 Paul Sorèze as Maxime
 Gloria France as Anna
 Isarco Ravaioli  
 Antoine Roblot as Alain, a photographer
 Simonetta Simeoni

References

External links 

 
 
 

1962 films
1962 romantic drama films
Films about tabloid journalism
Films directed by Louis Malle
Films set in Paris
Films set in Switzerland
Films with screenplays by Jean-Paul Rappeneau
1960s French-language films
French romantic drama films
Films scored by Fiorenzo Carpi
1960s French films